Major-General Ian Lennox Freer  (born ) is a former British Army officer who commanded 5th Division.

Military career
Freer was educated at George Watson's College, Edinburgh, then attended Royal Military Academy Sandhurst. He was commissioned into the Staffordshire Regiment in 1961. He was appointed Chief of British Mission to Soviet Forces in Europe in 1989 and then served as Commander Land Forces in Northern Ireland from 1991 to 1994 during the troubles. He went on to be General Officer Commanding Wales and Western District in 1994 and General Officer Commanding 5th Division in 1995 before retiring in 1996.

He was also given the colonelcy of the Staffordshire Regiment from 1990 to 1995.

On his retirement in 1996 he settled in Melbourne, Australia, and became chairman of Ocean Software.

References

 

|-

1941 births
Living people
People educated at George Watson's College
Graduates of the Royal Military Academy Sandhurst
British Army major generals
Companions of the Order of the Bath
Commanders of the Order of the British Empire
Staffordshire Regiment officers
British military personnel of The Troubles (Northern Ireland)